Phoebe Jakubczyk (born 26 August 2003) is a British artistic gymnast. Jakubczyk competed at the 2021 European Championships in Basel, Switzerland. She took the silver medal in the uneven bars final at the 2019 Szombathely World Challenge Cup. She is currently a member of the Oregon State Beavers women's gymnastics team.

Competitive History

References

2003 births
Living people
British female artistic gymnasts
Sportspeople from Bristol
People from Portishead, Somerset
Oregon State Beavers women's gymnasts
21st-century British women